Punta San Juan Airport  is an airport serving the village of Corral De Mulas in Usulután Department, El Salvador. Corral de Mulas is also served by Corral de Mulas Airport.

See also

Transport in El Salvador
List of airports in El Salvador

References

External links
 OpenStreetMap - Punta San Juan
 HERE/Nokia - Punta San Juan
 FalllingRain - Punta San Juan

Airports in El Salvador